Arthur Leander True (May 14, 1874 – May 27, 1952) was an American politician in the state of Washington. He served in the Washington House of Representatives and Washington State Senate.

References

1874 births
1952 deaths
Republican Party members of the Washington House of Representatives
Republican Party Washington (state) state senators